Bent Jensen (born 1951/1952) is a Danish billionaire businessman, and the owner and CEO of Linak, a Danish linear actuator manufacturing company.

Early life
Jensen earned a degree in mechanical engineering from the University of Southern Denmark. Jensen's grandfather founded Christian Jensen and Sons in 1907, and it originally produced pulleys, grinding mills and forges.

Career
In 1976, Jensen took over the running of the company from his father, when there were just seven employees. In 1979, he started to make linear actuators, which became the company's main product.

In 1984, the company was renamed Linak.

Personal life
Jensen lives in Nordborg, Denmark.

References

Living people
Danish billionaires
1950s births
University of Southern Denmark alumni
People from Sønderborg Municipality